Vetagrande Municipality is one of 58 municipalities of Zacatecas, Mexico. It has an area of 142 km² occupying 0.18% of state territory. The municipal seat is located in the town of the same name. Another town of this municipality is Llano de las Vírgenes.

References

Municipalities of Zacatecas
Populated places in Zacatecas